Halonectria is a fungal genus  in the class Sordariomycetes. This is a monotypic genus, containing the single species Halonectria milfordensis.

References

Bionectriaceae
Monotypic Sordariomycetes genera